Pudge is a nickname of various people:

 Carlton Fisk (born 1947), Hall-of-Fame Major League Baseball catcher
 Pudge Heffelfinger (1867-1954), considered the first recorded professional American football player
 Pudge MacKenzie (1909-1960), American National Hockey League player
 Iván Rodríguez (born 1971), Hall-of-Fame Major League Baseball catcher
 Pudge Wyman (1895-1961), American football player credited with several National Football League firsts, including the first touchdown

Lists of people by nickname